Elizaveta Khasanzhonovna Khudaiberdieva (born 2 October 2002) is a Russian ice dancer. With her current skating partner, Egor Bazin, she is the 2022 Russian national bronze medalist. 

With her former skating partner, Nikita Nazarov, she is the 2019 World Junior silver medalist and the 2018–19 Junior Grand Prix Final bronze medalist. She also won four gold medals on the ISU Junior Grand Prix series, two with Nazarov and two with Andrei Filatov.

Personal life 
Elizaveta Khudaiberdieva was born on 2 October 2002 in Mytishchi, Russia.

Career

Early career 
Khudaiberdieva began learning to skate in 2006. She was a single skater until 2015–2016 season. She then switched to ice dancing and teamed up with Nikita Nazarov. They started to compete together in 2016–2017 season. They were coached by Denis Samokhin and Maria Borovikova.

2016–2017 season 
Khudaiberdieva/Nazarov made their international junior debut in January 2017 at the 2017 Toruń Cup, where they won the gold medal.

They placed 8th at the 2017 Russian Junior Championships.

2017–2018 season 
Khudaiberdieva/Nazarov received their first ISU Junior Grand Prix (JGP) assignments in the 2017–2018 season. They won medals at both JGP events, first a bronze medal in late August in Brisbane, Australia and then the silver medal in October in Gdańsk, Poland. 

They placed fifth at the 2018 Russian Junior Championships after placing second in the short dance and sixth in the free dance.

2018–2019 season: World Junior silver medal 
Khudaiberdieva/Nazarov won their first JGP gold medal in August at the 2018 JGP event in Bratislava, Slovakia, after placing first in both the rhythm dance and the free dance. They scored their personal best score of 159.62 points, and they beat the silver medalists, Shanaeva/Naryzhnyy, by about seven points. Their rhythm dance, free dance, and combined total scores at this competition were the highest scores achieved in an international junior ice dance competition at the time, subsequently surpassed by others.

At their second JGP event of the season in Ostrava, Czech Republic, they won a second gold medal. Again they were ranked first in both the rhythm dance and the free dance. With two JGP gold medals, they qualified for the 2018–19 Junior Grand Prix Final.  At the Final, Khudaiberdieva/Nazarov won the bronze medal after placing third in the rhythm dance and fourth in the free dance. They were part of a Russian sweep of the ice dance podium. Khudaiberdieva/Nazarov were about 6 points behind both the gold medalists, Shevchenko/Eremenko and the silver medalists, Ushakova/Nekrasov, who were separated by only a 0.01 point. Khudaiberdieva/Nazarov won the bronze medal over Canadians Lajoie/Lagha, who placed fourth by a margin of only 0.03 points.

After winning the bronze medal at the 2019 Russian Junior Championships, Khudaiberdieva/Nazarov concluded the season at the 2019 World Junior Championships.  They placed second in the rhythm dance, winning a silver small medal and unexpectedly beating their Russian teammates due to superior results on the tango pattern dance.  They came fourth in the free dance but remained in second place overall, winning the silver medal.  Khudaiberdieva said the result was not something they had expected, as "we were the number three Russian team, a confident number three though. For us, it was more about overcoming ourselves than anyone else. We haven’t realized yet that we are second at our first Junior Worlds."  Noting that it was their final junior season, Nazarov said, "there are many teams in Russia, but if you look at the results at major events, they are not that great.  But all these teams also once came up from juniors. We just have to work very hard in order to achieve something."

On May 13, 2019, it was announced that Khudaiberdieva and Nazarov had split.

2019–2020 season: Debut of Khudaiberdieva/Filatov 
Khudaiberdieva teamed up with Andrei Filatov in late April 2019. The team made their international junior debut in September 2019 at the 2019 JGP event in Riga, Latvia, where they won the gold medal. They placed first in the rhythm dance and second in the free dance, winning over the silver medalists, Georgian team Kazakova/Reviya, by about 0.3 points. 

The pair were withdrawn from their second event, JGP Poland, due to a medical problem and were reassigned to the final Junior Grand Prix stage of the season, JGP Italy. In Egna, they again won gold and qualified for 2019–20 ISU Junior Grand Prix Final, where they finished fourth. Khudaiberdieva/Filatov did not compete again until February 2020 at the  2020 Russian Junior Nationals, where they finished just off the podium in fourth, thus narrowly missing being named to the team for the 2020 World Junior Figure Skating Championships.

In May 2020, Khudaiberdieva was listed as a member of the Russian senior national figure skating team with a new partner, two-time Winter Universiade silver medalist Egor Bazin, marking the end of her partnership with Filatov and her advancement to the senior ranks. Khudaiberdieva/Bazin were to be coached in Balashikha by a hybrid team of Khudaiberdieva's coaches, Denis Samokhin and Maria Borovikova, and Bazin's coach, Oleg Sudakov.

2020–2021 season: Debut of Khudaiberdieva/Bazin 
Khudaiberdieva/Bazin made their debut at the senior Russian test skates, where Bazin fell on a twizzle in the free dance. They made their competitive debut at the first stage of the domestic Russian Cup series, the qualifying competition series to the 2021 Russian Figure Skating Championships, in Syzran in September. They placed first in the rhythm dance and second in the free dance to narrowly win the gold medal ahead of Morozov/Bagin. At their next event, the third stage held in Sochi, the team placed second in both the rhythm dance and the free dance to take second overall behind reigning national bronze medalists Zahorski/Guerreiro.

In November, Khudaiberdieva/Bazin made their international debut at the 2020 Rostelecom Cup, where they placed fifth in the rhythm dance, just narrowly behind Morozov/Bagin. In the free dance, Khudaiberdieva/Bazin managed to overtake Morozov/Bagin by a little less than three points to place fourth in the free dance and fourth overall.

Competing at their first senior Russian Championships together (and Khudaiberdieva's first), they placed fourth in the rhythm dance despite a twizzle wobble from Bazin that earned him only a level 2 on that element.  In the free dance, Khudaiberdieva stumbled on her twizzle sequence, placing them sixth in that segment and fifth overall.

Following the national championships, Khudaiberdieva/Bazin participated in the 2021 Channel One Trophy, a televised team competition held in lieu of the cancelled European Championships.  They were selected for the Red Machine team captained by Alina Zagitova.  They placed fifth in both their segments of the competition, while their team finished first overall.

2021–2022 season 
Khudaiberdieva/Bazin began the season at the 2021 CS Denis Ten Memorial Challenge, where they won the bronze medal and then took gold at the Volvo Open Cup. In their lone Grand Prix assignment, they were eighth at the 2021 Rostelecom Cup.

At the 2022 Russian Championships, Khudaiberdieva/Bazin placed sixth in the rhythm dance. In the free dance, following the withdrawal of top team Sinitsina/Katsalapov due to injury, Khudaiberdieva/Bazin moved up to the bronze medal with a third place in that segment. Bazin said afterward, "not only one couple tried to qualify for the Olympics, everyone tried. We want to at least have a chance to fight a little bit." This was widely interpreted as querying the validity of the scores for controversial silver medalists Davis/Smolkin.

Programs

With Bazin

With Filatov

With Nazarov

Records and achievements 
(with Nazarov)
 
 Set the junior-level ice dancing record of the new +5 / -5 GOE (Grade of Execution) system for the combined total (159.62 points), rhythm dance (64.39 points) and free dance (95.23 points) at the 2018 JGP Slovakia.

Competitive highlights 
GP: Grand Prix; CS: Challenger Series; JGP: Junior Grand Prix

With Bazin

With Filatov

With Nazarov

Detailed results 
Small medals for short and free programs awarded only at ISU Championships.

With Bazin

With Filatov

With Nazarov

References

External links 
 
 
 

! colspan="3" style="border-top: 5px solid #78FF78;" |World Junior Record Holders

2002 births
Russian female ice dancers
World Junior Figure Skating Championships medalists
Living people
People from Mytishchi
Russian people of Uzbekistani descent